Royle's mountain vole (Alticola roylei) is a species of rodent in the family Cricetidae.
It is found in China, Nepal, Pakistan and India.

References

Alticola
Rodents of India
Rodents of China
Mammals described in 1842
Taxonomy articles created by Polbot